Stan Jurd, also known by the nickname of "Plunket", is an Australian former professional rugby league footballer who played in the 1980s. He played for the North Sydney Bears and Parramatta Eels in the New South Wales Rugby League (NSWRL) competition. Jurd primarily played in the front-row.

Playing career
Jurd was born and grew up in Moree. After high school he moved to the ACT region, playing for the Queanbeyan Blues before joining North Sydney and then moving to Parramatta in 1983. 

Jurd played two seasons at the North Sydney Bears between 1981–1982. He then joined Parramatta Eels for five seasons between 1983–1987, including winning the 1983 premiership with them. He was selected to represent New South Wales for games II and III of the 1983 State of Origin series. Injuries plagued the rest of his career until his retirement.

References

Sources
 

1958 births
Living people
Australian rugby league players
New South Wales Rugby League State of Origin players
North Sydney Bears players
Parramatta Eels players
Rugby league props